Shiravand Naveh (also Romanized as Shīrāvand Nāveh; also known as Shīrāvand and Nāveh Shīrāvand) is a village in Gol Gol Rural District, in the Central District of Kuhdasht County, Lorestan Province, Iran. At the 2006 census, its population was 475, in 97 families.

References 

Towns and villages in Kuhdasht County